The 2021–22 Basketball Champions League playoffs began on April 5, 2022 and concluded with the 2022 Basketball Champions League Final Four, to decide the champions of the 2021–22 Basketball Champions League. A total of eight teams competed in the play-offs.

Format
The 8 qualified clubs have been ranked according to their final position within their respective group during the Round of 16 and their place in the Draw was based on this ranking. The teams having finished 1st of their Round of 16 group was placed in Pot 1, the teams having finished 2nd of their Round of 16 group was placed in Pot 2. The draw was held on March 25, 2022.

The quarterfinals will be played in a best-of-3 series and start on April 5. The seeded teams will play their first (and potential third) game at home, the unseeded teams will play their second game at home.

The four winning clubs will qualify for the Final Four. The 4 qualified teams will play the final four between May 6–8, 2022.

Qualified teams

Bracket

Quarterfinals

|}

U-BT Cluj-Napoca vs. Riesen Ludwigsburg

Baxi Manresa vs. Unicaja

Hapoel Holon vs. SIG Strasbourg

Lenovo Tenerife vs. Tofaş

References

External links
 

 
Basketball Champions League
Basketball Champions League playoffs